Integrated Programme - an education programme in Singapore
 EU Integrated programme - European Union Integrated action programme in the field of Lifelong learning